Russell Cropanzano is an American management scholar. As of 2022, he is a professor of organizational behavior at the Leeds School of Business, University of Colorado Boulder.

Education and career
Cropanzano gained a BA in psychology from Louisiana State University (1983) and an MA from Southern Methodist University (1985). His doctorate in industrial/organizational psychology is from Purdue University (1988); his dissertation is titled "A Conceptual Analysis of Organizational Plans".

He served on the faculty of the psychology department at Colorado State University (1988–2002) and of the Eller School of Management at the University of Arizona (2002–12). He has been  a professor at the University of Colorado-Boulder since 2012.

Research
Cropanzano's research is in the areas of emotion in the workplace, organizational justice perceptions in the workplace, worker well-being, and employee burnout.

Selected works

References

External links
Google Scholar profile

Living people
Year of birth missing (living people)
Louisiana State University alumni
Southern Methodist University alumni
Purdue University alumni
University of Colorado Boulder faculty
Management scientists
Colorado State University faculty
University of Arizona faculty